YPB or ypb may refer to:

 YPB, the IATA code for Port Alberni (Alberni Valley Regional) Airport, British Columbia, Canada
 ypb, the ISO 639-3 code for Labo Phowa language, China